Jahangirnagar University ( JU) is a public university located in Savar, Dhaka, Bangladesh. It is the only fully residential university in Bangladesh. It operated as a project until 1973, when the 'Jahangirnagar Muslim University Act' was amended as the 'Jahangirnagar University Act'.
It has been ranked third several times in national public university rankings. 

JU is the fourth oldest generalized public university in Bangladesh. Also, it has fourth largest university campus in Bangladesh. It is one of the most beautiful university in Bangladesh. In 2019, the university had 17,212 students, 836 teachers, and 2,018 other employees.

History 

Jahangirnagar was the former name of Dhaka. The Mughal city of Dhaka was named Jahangirnagar (City of Jahangir) in honour of the erstwhile ruling Mughal Emperor Jahangir by Islam Khan in 1610. 

Jahangirnagar University was established in 20 August 1970, but formally launched on 12 January 1971 under the Jahangirnagar Muslim University Ordinance, 1970 and this day is observed as University Day. Initially, it was named Jahangirnagar Muslim University, and the plan was to operate the university like Aligarh Muslim University. But after the independence of Bangladesh, its name changed to Jahangirnagar University under the Jahangirnagar University Act' 1973. The university was established on 20 August 1970 by the Jahangirnagar Muslim University Ordinance of the government of Pakistan.

Its first vice-chancellor, Mafizuddin Ahmed (PhD in chemistry, Penn State) took up office on 24 September 1970. The first group of students, a total of 150, were enrolled in four departments: Economics, Geography, Mathematics, and Statistics. Its formal inauguration was delayed until 12 January 1971, when the university was launched by Rear Admiral S. M. Ahsan, the chancellor.

Jahangirnagar University Act of 1973
ACT NO. XXXIV OF 1973, an act to repeal the Jahangirnagar Muslim University Ordinance, 1970 and to provide for reconstitution and reorganisation of the Jahangirnagar Muslim University.

Location and campus

The university stands on the west side of the Asian Highway, popularly known as the Dhaka-Aricha Road, and is 32 kilometres away from the capital. Spread over an area of 697.56 acres (2.8 km2), the campus surrounded by the Bangladesh Public Administration Training Centre (BPATC) on the south, and the Savar Cantonment on the northeast, on the north of which is the National Monument (Jatiyo Smriti Soudho) and a large dairy farm on the east. JU is considered as the most beautiful university in Bangladesh. The topography of the land with its gentle rise and plains is pleasing to the eyes. The water features sprawled around the campus make an excellent habitat for the winter birds that flock in every year in the thousands and consequently, it is a site frequented by many bird watchers. On 19 January 2017, the university arranged a bird fair in its Zahir Rayhan auditorium. The Shahid Minar (martyrs' monument) of JU is the tallest in Bangladesh, 71 feet high and made of ceramic bricks on a base 52 feet in circumference. The height signifies the war of independence fought in 1971 and the circumference refers to the language movement of 1952. It is designed by architect Robiul Hossain.

The university is an autonomous body managed by an executive council known as 'The Syndicate'. Its statutes need ratification by the Senate of the university, which meets at least once a year to do the same. The Senate passes the annual budget of the university, reviews its academic matters, and elects a panel of three nominees for the position of its vice-chancellor once every four years. the selection and appointment are made by the president of Bangladesh, who is the chancellor of the university. The chancellor also appoints the pro-vice-chancellor and the treasurer of the university.

List of vice-chancellors
The first vice chancellor, Mafizuddin Ahmed, was appointed in 1970.

Academics
Jahangirnagar University is the only university in Bangladesh which preserves about 50% of the total seats for female students.

Faculties 
There are 36 departments under six faculties.

Faculty of Mathematical and Physical Sciences

 Department of Chemistry
 Department of Computer Science and Engineering
 Department of Environmental Sciences
 Department of Geological Sciences
 Department of Mathematics
 Department of Physics
 Department of Statistics

Faculty of Social Sciences
 Department of Anthropology
 Department of Economics
 Department of Geography and Environment
 Department of Government and Politics
 Department of Public Administration
 Department of Urban and Regional Planning

Faculty of Arts and Humanities

 Department of Archaeology
 Department of Bangla
 Department of English
 Department of Drama and Dramatics
 Department of Fine Arts
 Department of History
 Department of International Relations
 Department of Journalism and Media Studies
 Department of Philosophy

Faculty of Biological Sciences

 Department of Botany
 Department of Biochemistry and Molecular Biology
 Department of Biotechnology and Genetic Engineering
 Department of Microbiology
 Department of Pharmacy
 Department of Public Health and Informatics
 Department of Zoology

Faculty of Business Studies

 Department of Accounting and Information Systems
 Department of Finance and Banking
 Department of Marketing
 Department of Management Studies

Faculty of Law

 Department of Law and Justice

Institutes 
There are four institutes for specialised research and training:
 Institute of Business Administration (E Unit)                                                                                                                                                                                                                                  Jahangirnagar University (IBA-JU) started as the university's Department of Business Administration (DBA) in 1991. This institute is the first in Bangladesh to offer an undergraduate degree in business. It offers a four-year course of study leading to a Bachelor of Business Administration (BBA) degree, and an eighteen-month post-graduate Master of Business Administration (MBA) program. Since May 2012, there is a Weekend MBA programme for working professionals. As of October 2015, the institute admits 50 students every year to its undergraduate programme. IBA-JU offers finance, marketing, and human resource management as majors. IBA-JU has seven student organisations such as Infusion-The Cultural Club of IBA-JU, Communic, IBA-JU Business Club, IBA-JU Social Welfare Club, Envision:IBA-JU Photography Club, IBA-JU Sports Club and IBA-JU Debating Club.
 Institute of Information Technology(A Unit) was established in 2009.
 Bangabandhu Institute of Comparative Literature and Culture(C Unit)
Institute of Remote Sensing and GIS   provides postgraduate degrees.

Student life
With sixteen residential halls (and new six are ready to inaugurate), Jahangirnagar University is mandated to provide residential accommodation to every student with separate halls for the female students. Each hall has its own administration system headed by a provost and is equipped with facilities such as playgrounds, rooms for indoor games, dining halls etc.

Halls/dorms

Halls for male students 
 Al Beruni Hall: the oldest dormitory of the campus, named after Abū Rayḥān al-Bīrūnī; it has an extension building. 

 Mir Mosharrof Hossain Hall: named after Mir Mosharraf Hossain.
 A. F. M. Kamaluddin Hall: named after one of the ex-vice-chancellors of Jahangirnagar University A.F.M. Kamaluddin, a geographer, who died prematurely.
 Shaheed Salam Barkat Hall: named after two language martyrs of the Bengali Language Movement.
 Maulana Bhashani Hall: named after Maulana Abdul Hamid Khan Bhashani.
 Bangabandhu Sheikh Mujibur Rahman Hall: named after the first President of Bangladesh, Bangabandhu Sheikh Mujibur Rahman.
 Shahid Rafiq Jabbar Hall: named after two language martyrs of Bengali Language Movement.
 Bishwakabi Rabindranath Tagore Hall: named after kobiguru Rabindranath Tagore.

Halls for female students 
 Nawab Faizunnesa Hall: named after the educator Nawab Faizunnesa Choudhurani (1834–1903).
 Fajilatunnesa Hall: named after the first Bengali female graduate in mathematics from University of Calcutta.
 Jahanara Imam Hall: named after Jahanara Imam
 Pritilata Hall: named after Pritilata Waddedar
 Begum Khaleda Zia Hall: named after Khaleda Zia, former prime minister of Bangladesh
 Sheikh Hasina Hall: named after Sheikh Hasina, prime minister of Bangladesh
 Sufia Kamal Hall: named after kobi Sufia Kamal, a famous poet and a political activist.
 Bangamata Begum Fazilatunnesa Mujib Hall: named after Sheikh Fazilatunnesa Mujib, first lady to the first President of Bangladesh, Bangabandhu Sheikh Mujibur Rahman

Central Library 
Established in 1985, the JU library is equipped with a huge collection of books. Located behind a monument of "Sangshaptak", the library is conveniently placed between the main academic buildings and the dormitories. The entire area has Wi-Fi coverage. There are more than 110,000 books, 14,000 hardbound journals, and 22,000 online journals in the library. The library can accommodate over 170 students at a time. There is a cyber centre on the premises. Airy with ample glass openings, the library is an elegant piece of architecture.

TSC
The teachers-student centre has the prime role in improving the relationship between the teachers and the students of the campus. It is a cultural hub for the university. Cultural groups usually perform drama and cultural programmes at Muktomoncho. Shaptam Chayamancha is a great attraction for students.

Zahir Raihan Auditorium
The "Zahir Raihan Auditorium", located in the TSC complex, is named after Zahir Raihan, a famous Bangladeshi novelist, writer and filmmaker. There is also a seminar hall for seminars, meetings and cultural programmes. The auditorium has 1500 seats, while the seminar hall can accommodate 250 persons. It is an auditorium fully equipped for drama, cultural activities, international conferences, and other similar events.

Natural Beauty of Campus

Monument

Graphitti Wall

Notable people

Alumni 
 Faruque Ahmed, theatre and television actor
 Kafil Ahmed, poet, singer, and painter of Bangladesh of contemporary age
 Azam Ali, scientist known for having developed a wound dressing
 Arindam Banik, IMI Kolkata Director
 Selim Al Deen, playwright and theatrical artist 
 Shariff Enamul Kabir, chemist and former VC of JU
 Humayun Faridi, theatrical performer 
 Fahmida Khatun , policy analyst and economist
 Zakia Bari Mamo, model and actress
 A A Mamun, physicist
 Shibli Mohammad, dancer and choreographer
 Mashrafe Bin Mortaza, MP of Bangladesh and ODI captain of Bangladesh National Cricket team
 Shajal Noor, model and actor
 Mohammad Rafiq, poet awarded Bangla Academy Literary Award in 1987 and Ekushey Padak in 2010
 Mushfiqur Rahim, former test captain
 Mohammad Mahfizur Rahman, competed in the 50 m freestyle event at the 2012 and 2016 Summer Olympics
 Mim Mantasha, the winner of Lux Channel I Superstar beauty pageant television reality show that was held in 2018
 Mashrafe Mortaza, cricket captain of the national cricket team
 Mohammad Salahuddin, former national team cricketer and national team coach 
 Shahiduzzaman Selim, theatre, television and film actor
 Sumaiya Shimu, television actress
 Shamim Reza, Poet
Soumitra Sekhar Dey leading Bengali linguist, educationist, and writer

Faculty 
 Syed Ali Ahsan, national professor
 Shariff Enamul Kabir, university administrator
 Mustafa Nurul Islam, national professor and former director general of Bangla Academy
 Hayat Mamud, essayist-poet
 Abdullah Al Mamun, Friedrich Wilhelm Bessel Research Award-winning physicist
 Anu Muhammad, economist and anthropologist 
 Mohammad Rafiq, poet awarded Bangla Academy Literary Award in 1987 and Ekushey Padak in 2010
 Syed Safiullah, environmental scientist
 Zillur Rahman Siddiqui, Shwadhinota Puroshkar winning professor
 M A Matin, Professor and Ex Vice-Chancellor

Awards
Prof. Jasim Uddin Ahmad FRSC (London) was awarded Ekushey Padak for his significant contribution in education in 2006.

See also
 Bangladesh University of Engineering and Technology (BUET)
 University of Dhaka (DU)
 University of Rajshahi (RU)
 University of Chittagong (CU)

References

External links

 
 Old photographs of the campus

 
Public universities of Bangladesh
Educational institutions established in 1970
1970 establishments in East Pakistan
Organisations based in Savar
Universities and colleges in Savar